Cultures: Discovery of Vinland is a 2000 real-time strategy and city-building game developed by Funatics Software and published by Phenomedia. It is the first entry in the Cultures series.

Gameplay
Cultures is a real-time strategy and city-building game in which players manage the historical Vinland settlements of the Vikings. This includes constructing roads, handling the settlement's economy and training citizens in jobs such as blacksmithing. The ultimate goal is to gather shards of a crashed meteor that possesses magical properties.

Development
Cultures was developed by Funatics Software, and was originally released in Europe during late 2000. Its North American release occurred on July 31, 2001.

Reception

Sales
As a city-building title, Cultures is part of a genre that tended to see success in European countries but "never seems to catch on in the States", GameSpot's Bruce Geryk wrote in 2001. PC Games billed it as a competitor to games such as The Settlers IV and Anno 1503. Retailers pre-purchased 140,000 units of Cultures in preparation for its release, and sales expectations were high; Funatics' previous title, Catan: Die Erste Insel, had become a sleeper hit. In the German market, Cultures debuted at #3 on Media Control's computer game sales chart for September 2000. It placed sixth the following month, before falling to 16th in November. Global sales of the game rose to 150,000 units by March 2002.

Critical reviews

John Lee reviewed the PC version of the game for Next Generation, rating it three stars out of five, and stated that "The gameplay may be plentiful, but Viking reputations will suffer."

Sequels
Cultures was followed by three sequels: Cultures 2: The Gates of Asgard, Cultures: Northland and Cultures: 8th Wonder of the World.

The Cultures franchise became Funatics' most successful line, with combined sales above 700,000 units by 2018.

References

2000 video games
Fictional Vikings
Classic Mac OS games
City-building games
Windows games
THQ games
Video games developed in Germany
Video games with isometric graphics
Video games set in the Viking Age